Barbara Margaret Trimble (née Gill; 15 or 21 February 1921 – 12 November 1995) was a British writer of more than 20 crime, thriller and romance novels between 1967 to 1991, under the names of Margaret Blake, B. M. Gill and Barbara Gilmour.

Life 
Barbara Margaret Gill was born in Holyhead, Anglesey, Wales; her father was Irish and her mother was Welsh.

Trimble was nominated twice for an Edgar Award for Best Novel, in 1985 (for The Twelfth Juror) and in 1988 (for Nursery Crimes).

She died in 1995.

Bibliography

As Margaret Blake

Single novels
 Stranger at the Door (1967)
 Bright Sun, Dark Shadow (1968)
 The Rare and the Lovely (1969)
 The Elusive Exile (1971)
 Courier to Danger (1973)
 Flight from Fear (1973)
 Apple of Discord (1975)
 Walk Softly and Beware (1977)

As B. M. Gill

Single novels
 Target Westminster (1977)
 Death Drop (1979)
 The Twelfth Juror (1984)
 Nursery Crimes (1986)
 Dying to Meet You (1988)
 Time and Time Again (1989)

Inspector Maybridge Series
 Victims (1980) (US title: Suspect)
 Seminar for Murder (1985)
 The Fifth Rapunzel (1991)

As Barbara Gilmour

Single novels
 You Can't Stay Here (1968)
 Pattern of Loving (1969)
 Threads of Fate (1971)
 Question the Wind (1973)

References

External links 

 B. M. Gill at Fantastic Fiction

1921 births
1995 deaths
20th-century Welsh women writers
20th-century Welsh novelists
People from Holyhead
Welsh crime novelists
Welsh romantic fiction writers
Welsh women novelists
Women romantic fiction writers
Women crime fiction writers
Welsh people of Irish descent
Pseudonymous women writers
20th-century pseudonymous writers